Chiang is a Sino-Tai loanword, from Middle Chinese  d͡ʑiᴇŋ, meaning "fort, castle", by extension, “city”. Chiang is part of the names of certain ancient cities and other places located in an area stretching across Northern Thailand, Northern Laos, NE Burma and Southern China. The most important are:
 Chiang Mai
 Chiang Rai
 Chiang Khong
 Chiang Saen
 Chiang Rung or Chiang Hung, Jinghong in China
 Chiang Tung, Kengtung in Shan State, Burma
 Chiang Thong, Luang Prabang in Laos
Chiang Kham District
Chiang Khan District
Chiang Dao District
Chiang Khaeng a Lue principality

See also
Mueang
Wiang (disambiguation)

References

Types of populated places
Thai words and phrases
Lan Na